The Koria railway station is located in the town of Kouvola, Finland, in the urban area and district of Koria. It is located along the Lahti–Kouvola railway, and its neighboring stations are Kausala in the west and Kouvola in the east.

Services 
Koria is served by all commuter trains on the route Lahti–Kouvola, and some of these services are operated from or continue towards Kotka as well. The intermediate stations between Lahti and Kouvola are also served by all but one  rush hour service on the route Helsinki–Lahti–Kouvola. Eastbound trains towards Kouvola and Kotka use track 1 and westbound trains towards Lahti and Helsinki stop at track 2.

References 

Kouvola
Railway stations in Kymenlaakso